The Three Godfathers may refer to:

 The Three Godfathers (novel), a 1913 novel by Peter B. Kyne, and its film adaptations:
 The Three Godfathers (1916 film), starring Harry Carey
 Three Godfathers (1936 film), featuring Chester Morris
 3 Godfathers (1948 film), starring John Wayne

See also
Marked Men (1919 film), a remake of the 1916 film, also starring Harry Carey, considered a lost film
Action (1921 film), an adaptation, regarded as lost
Hell's Heroes (film) (1930), another adaptation, starring Charles Bickford
Tokyo Godfathers (2003), an anime film by Satoshi Kon about three homeless people who find an abandoned newborn